Big Daddy G may refer to:

Dave Glover, a Canadian blues guitarist
Gary H. Mason, a music producer
Big Daddy G Revue, an act associated with Richard "Hock" Walsh